Guzalbon (also Romanized as Gūzalbon; also known as Gazal Bon) is a village in Rahimabad Rural District, Rahimabad District, Rudsar County, Gilan Province, Iran. At the 2006 census, its population was 248, in 65 families.

References 

Populated places in Rudsar County